Stefano Gabbana (born 14 November 1962) is a fashion designer and, along with Domenico Dolce, the co-founder of the Dolce & Gabbana luxury fashion house.

Early life
Gabbana was born in Milan to a father who worked in a printing factory and a mother who worked for a laundry service. His family is from Veneto: his mother was born in Ceggia and his father in Cessalto. He graduated from the Istituto Superiore per le Industrie Artistiche, a design institute in Rome.

Career

In 1980, Gabbana met Sicilian Domenico Dolce through Dolce's employer, designer Giorgio Correggiari. Correggiari, who died in 2012, was extremely influential on the pair, Gabbana said in 2013: "He was not very famous. But for us he was important. He taught us especially what 'not' to do."

In 1983, Gabbana and Dolce left Correggiari to work on their own; two years later, they launched Dolce & Gabbana S.p.A. (D&G).

In October 1985, the Dolce & Gabbana brand made its fashion show debut at Milano Collezioni's Nuovi Talenti (New Talents). In March 1986, D&G released its first collection and held its own show, "Real Women." In 1987, the first D&G store opened in Milan, at 7 Via Santa Cecilia. In 1988, D&G established a partnership with Dolce's father, Saverio, who owned the manufacturing company Dolce Saverio in Legnano, near Milan.

D&G continued to expand, holding its first fashion shows in Tokyo (April 1989) and New York (April 1990), and releasing new collection lines, including its first lingerie and beachwear line in July 1989, and its first menswear line in January 1990. In November 1990, D&G opened its New York City showroom at 532 Broadway in SoHo, Manhattan. D&G released its first fragrance, Dolce & Gabbana Parfum, in October 1992.

In 1993, the Italian designers received worldwide fame when Madonna chose D&G to design the costumes for her Girlie Show World Tour. They have since gone on to design for Monica Bellucci, Kylie Minogue, Angelina Jolie and Isabella Rossellini.

Later additions to the D&G line included ties, belts, handbags, sunglasses, watches and footwear. By 2003, the company sold more products in Italy than Armani, Gucci, Prada, and Versace. In 2009, nearly 25 years after D&G opened, the company had 113 stores and 21 factory outlets, a staff of 3,500 people and an annual turnover of more than €1 billion.

Personal life

Gabbana and Dolce were an open couple for many years. Following their success, they lived in a 19th-century villa in Milan, and owned several properties on the French Riviera. They ended their long-time relationship in 2003, but the pair still work together at D&G.

As of March 2015, Gabbana was the 28th richest person in Italy with a net worth of approximately US$1.56 billion, according to Forbes.

Legal troubles

In 2013, both Stefano Gabbana and Domenico Dolce were convicted of tax evasion and sentenced to a 20-month suspended sentence in prison.  An Italian court found the pair guilty of failing to declare millions of euros of revenue earned through a D&G subsidiary company, Gado, based in Luxembourg. They denied the charges and appealed the case; in October 2014 they were both cleared of wrongdoing by the appellate court.

IVF position

In March 2015, singer-songwriter Elton John called for a boycott of the D&G brand after Dolce referred to babies born through in vitro fertilization as "chemistry children and synthetic children" in an interview. This sparked a war of words, with Gabbana later calling John a "fascist" and calling for a counter-boycott. However, he later clarified that his views on IVF were separate from that of Dolce. When asked on CNN whether he supported IVF, he responded: "Yeah, I don't have anything bad (to say), because the beauty of the world is freedom" and "We love gay couple. We are gay. We love gay couple. We love gay adoption. We love everything. It's just an express of my private point of view."

China-related comments on Instagram 
On 21 November 2018, Gabbana was publicly exposed on Instagram for making racist comments regarding China, including "China ignorant dirty smelling mafia" and calling China "a country of shit". The Shanghai D&G Great Show 2018 was cancelled because of the commercials and his comments. Dolce & Gabbana said the account was hacked and it loved China and its culture.
On 1 December, Dolce & Gabbana deleted the apology video on Weibo.

Honours

Gabbana and Dolce have received numerous honours for their fashion and cultural contributions. Their first fashion award, the International Woolmark Prize, came in 1991. In 1993, their Dolce & Gabbana Parfum was named the Best Fragrance of the Year.

In 2009, the City of Milan awarded them the Ambrogino Gold medal; in 2014, they announced intentions to return it after a city council member called them tax evaders.
In 2014, the La Fondazione NY, a charity aimed at supporting young Italian and American artists, honoured Gabbana, Dolce and Luhrmann at its third awards gala at the Museum of the Moving Image in New York City.  "We live with movies - our inspiration all the time is movies and we make our collection like a movie," Gabbana said during the event.

Film and television

Gabbana appears in the 2013 documentary, Scatter My Ashes at Bergdorf's, made about the fashion industry. He also made a cameo appearance in Woody Allen's film To Rome with Love in 2012, and was a presenter at the MTV Europe Music Awards in 2002. Gabbana also plays in Giuseppe Tornatore's 1995 movie The Star Maker (L'Uomo delle stelle in Italian).

References

External links
 

1962 births
Living people
Fashion designers from Milan
Italian fashion designers
Istituto Superiore per le Industrie Artistiche alumni
Italian gay artists
Gay businessmen
LGBT fashion designers
Italian LGBT businesspeople
Dolce & Gabbana
Italian billionaires
People of Venetian descent